Chiaroscuro is a live album by British musician, songwriter and producer Steven Wilson under the pseudonym Bass Communion. The title track was recorded live in Antwerp in November 2008. The second track, Fusilier also appears on the Bass Communion / Fear Falls Burning split 7" LP given away to attendees of the concert.

Track listing

Personnel

 Steven Wilson - Guitar, Laptop, Microphone
 Carl Glover - Photography, Cover Design

References 

Bass Communion albums
2009 live albums